A senatus consultum (Latin: decree of the senate, plural: senatus consulta) is a text emanating from the senate in Ancient Rome. It is used in the modern phrase senatus consultum ultimum. 

Translated into French as sénatus-consulte, the term was also used during the French Consulate, the First French Empire and the Second French Empire.

Republic
In the case of the ancient Roman Senate under the Roman Kingdom, it was simply an opinion expressed by the senate, such as the Senatus consultum Macedonianum or the Senatus consultum de Bacchanalibus. Under the Republic, it referred to a text promulgated by the senate on planned laws presented to the senate by a consul or praetor. Officially these consulta were merely advice given to the Republic's magistrates, but in practice magistrates often followed them to the letter. Despite only being an opinion, it was considered obligatory to have one before submitting the decision to a vote and moreover a hostile consultum from the senate almost systematically provoked the new law's abandonment or modification. If a consultum conflicted with a law promulgated by one of the Republic's legislative assemblies, the law took on a priority status and overrode the consultum. All proposed motions could be blocked by a veto from a tribune of the plebs or an intercessio by one of the executive magistrates. Each motion blocked by a veto was registered in the annals as senatus auctoritas (will of the senate). Each ratified motion finally became a senatus consultum. Each senatus auctoritas and each senatus consultum was transcribed in a document by the president, which was then deposited in the Aerarium.

Empire
Under the Roman Empire, the Roman legislative assemblies were rapidly neutralised. The first emperors transferred all legislative powers to the senate. After this transfer, the senatus consulta had the force of law. The senate's legislative power and right to issue consulta were suppressed in the 3rd century under the Dominate, in reference to the full powers conferred to the imperium. In the continued decline in praetorian law, the change rendered the emperor alone the guarantor of law and the Imperial constitution.

References

Sources 

 Robert Byrd, The Senate of the Roman Republic, 1995, U.S. Government Printing Office, Senate Document 103-23 ;
 Polybius, History, book 6
 Frank Frost Abbott, A History and Description of Roman Political Institutions, 1901, Elibron Classics, .

Roman law
Roman Senate

fi:Senatus consultum